Lady Blanche Maud de la Poer Beresford Girouard (13 October 1898 – 29 September 1940) was an Irish journalist and writer. She was the eldest child of the 6th Marquess of Waterford.

Life
She was born Lady Blanche Maud de la Poer Beresford to Henry Beresford, 6th Marquess of Waterford, and Lady Beatrix Frances Petty-FitzMaurice on 13 October 1898 in London. She grew up in Curraghmore, Portlaw, County Waterford. Girouard married Major Richard Desiré Girouard on 26 October 1927 at Westminster Cathedral. They had three children, one of whom was the historian and writer Mark Girouard. Girouard died as the result of a car accident in 1940 and is buried in Molesey Cemetery, Surrey. She made the news in 1929 when she converted to Catholicism.

Girouard wrote novels and short stories. She was also a contributor to newspapers such as The Evening News. A book of her stories and one novel were published before she died. A reviewer in Brisbane described the novel thus: "as to the manner of the writing there is only one verdict possible; It is a thing of beauty, the beauty of pure language, of poetic thought, and of idyllic Imagery". The writing style of her book of stories received similar praise.

Bibliography
 The Story of Keth (1928)
 The World is for the Young (1935)

References and sources

1898 births
1940 deaths
20th-century Irish women writers
People from County Waterford
Converts to Roman Catholicism from Anglicanism
Daughters of British marquesses
Blanche
Irish fantasy writers